Sven-Ingvars is a Swedish pop/rock group from Slottsbron, Sweden. The band was formed in 1956 by Sven Svärd (drums), Ingvar Karlsson (guitar and accordion),  Sven-Erik Magnusson (vocals, guitar, and clarinet). Later the band were joined first by Rune Bergman on bass guitar and then by Sven-Olof Petersson on tenor and baritone saxophone. The group made their first EP as a quartet in the early 1960s (Guitar Boogie). In the mid-1960s the group was popular in Sweden with hits such as "Te' dans me' Karlstatösera", "Ett litet rött paket", "Fröken Fräken", "Börja om från början", "Säj inte nej, säj kanske, kanske, kanske", "Vid din sida", Önskebrunnen and many others. They were so popular that in 1963, the opening act for the group was The Beatles.

Biography
Ingvar Karlsson is the only remaining member of the band since the start in 1956. Since the 1970s, they have often been classified as a dansband. In 1990, Sven-Ingvars was awarded a Grammis for "Dansband of the year". In 2005, Sven-Ingvars was awarded the "special prize from the jury" at the Grammis awards.

Former member, Sven-Erik Magnusson, died on 22 March 2017 of cancer. The band continued with his son as a singer.

On 6 July 2019 keyboardist Thommy Gustafsson died at the age of 71.

Discography

 Te' dans mä Karlstatösera (1963)
 Sven Ingvars (1964)
 Dans ikväll (1966)
 Nu är vi här... igen (1968)
 Sven-Ingvars i Carnegie Hall (1970)
 Sven-Ingvars i Frödingland (1971)
 Man borde inte sova (1972)
 På turné (1973)
 Allt går igen (1973)
 Guld (1975)
 Playa blanca (1976)
 Åh, va skönt (1977)
 Ett vykort från Sven-Ingvars (1978)
 Apropå (1980)
 Sven-Ingvars jubileums à la carte (1981)
 Å vilka tider (1982)
 Våga - vinn (1983)
 Exposé (1985)
 Nya vindar (1987)
 Sven-Ingvars kvartett rainbow music (1989)
 Dansparty (1992)
 Allt går igen (1993)
 Två mörka ögon (1994)
 På begäran (1994)
 Byns enda blondin (1994)
 En dröm om våren (1995)
 Du flicka med vind i ditt hår (1995)
 Septemberbarn (1995)
 Kärlekens alla färger (1995)
 Lika ung som då (1996)
 Hus till salu (1997)
 Nio liv (1998)
 Älskar du mig (1999)
 Retro aktiv (2000)
 Här nere på jorden (2001)
 Musik vi minns (2003)
 Guld & Glöd (2005)

Citations

External links
Grammis awards of 1990
Grammis awards of 2005

Musical groups established in 1956
Dansbands
Swedish pop music groups
1956 establishments in Sweden